Dan Austin is a sound engineer and music producer and mixer working in the United Kingdom. Austin also performs as a bassist.

Early life
Austin attended The George Ward School and Lowbourne Junior School in Wiltshire. While in school he formed a band called Four Parts Water, towards the end of his time studying at The George Ward School he began working part-time at Moles Studio in Bath.

Career
In 2004, Austin played bass with the band the Cooper Temple Clause. He also produced a number of recordings with the group. He produced the band Cherry Ghost album, A Thirst For Romance and the follow-up albums Beneath this Burning Shoreline and Herd Runners. In 2008 a song he produced for this band won the Ivor Novello award.

Austin has contributed to the Doves' Kingdom Of Rust and new tracks on the Best Of release which he produced. Austin has also produced an album for US act Evaline, and he has also mixed tracks for Morning Parade and Young Rebel Set.

In 2010 Austin was producing and recording at the Moles Studio in Bath. He produced the debut album for Airship, as well as two EPs for this group.

Austin was shortlisted for a Music Producers Guild Award in 2013.

Since 2013 Austin has worked with Gil Norton on albums by Twin Atlantic, Futures, Pulled Apart By Horses and Maxïmo Park as well as tracks by The People the Poet and You Me At Six. Austin and Gil finished the debut album '‘Anthems’' for Pure Love, the new band from ex-Gallows frontman Frank Carter and in 2014 Austin produced an album with the band Arcane Roots.

Production, mixing and engineering credits

 Del Amitri (Producer, Engineer & Mixer) Fatal Mistakes Album
 You Me At Six (Producer, Engineer & Mixer) Suckapunch Album
 Doves (Producer, Engineer & Mixer) The Universal Want Album
 You Me At Six (Engineer & Producer) VI Album
 Twin Atlantic (Producer, Engineer & Mixerr) Power
 Guide Dog (Mixer) Lovely Domestic Bliss Album
 LOA State (Mixer) Forthcoming Album
 Soundhorn (Mixer) Extended Mixes for Shadowlark
 Lisbon (Mixer) Forthcoming tracks
 Everyone You Know (Mixer) Forthcoming EP
 She Makes War (Producer & Mixer) Brace for Impact Album
 Fine Creatures (Producer, Engineer & Mixer) Electric La La Land EP
 The Ninth Wave (Producer & Engineer) Never Crave Attention Album
 Pretty Vicious (Producer & Mixer) Beauty of Youth
 Shadowlark (Mixer) Forthcoming tracks
 SheMakesWar (Engineer & Mixer) Forthcoming tracks
 The Ninth Wave (Producer & Mixer) Forthcoming EP
 MOSES (Producer & Mixer) Forthcoming track “Kingsize”
 Shadowlark (Producer & Mixer) Forthcoming tracks
 SoShe (Co-producer & Mixer) Forthcoming EP
 Love Amongst Ruin (Producer) Forthcoming track
 Guidedog (Producer & Mixer) Forthcoming album
 Sløtface (Producer, Engineer & Mixer) Try Not to Freak Out
 SoShe Feat. Cadet (Additional Producer & Mixer) "Showed Up" track
 Mallory Knox (Producer & Mixer) Wired Album
 Young Legionnaire (Mixer) Zero Worship Album
 Lisbon (Producer & Mixer) "Vice", "Shark" + forthcoming track
 Gallery Circus (Producer & Mixer) "Holland on Fire" * "Club House Killer" tracks
 Sløtface (Producer, Engineer & Mixer) "Sponge State" and "Empire Records" EPs
 Love Amongst Ruin (Producer & Mixer) Lose Your Way Album
 Monarks (Producer & Mixer) "You Were My Fire", "Amorous" tracks + forthcoming EP
 Daisy Victoria (Producer & Mixer) Animal Lover EP
 Losers (Mixer) How To Ruin Other People’s Futures Album
 Leaders of Men (Engineer) Forthcoming tracks
 She Makes War (Mixer) Disarm: 15 EP
 Army of Bones (Engineer) Army of Bones Album
 Benji Wild (Engineer & Mixer) Watch and Learn track and forthcoming tracks
 HEN (Mixer) Forthcoming album
 Pleasure Beach (Mixer) Dreamer to the Dawn EP
 Club Kuru (Producer, Engineer & Mixer) Layla EP & forthcoming tracks
 Monarks (Mixer) The End EP
 Britain (Producer & Engineer) Forthcoming tracks
 JAWS (Engineer) Simplicity Album
 The Enemy (Mixer) It’s Automatic album
 Ollie Smith (Producer) Forthcoming tracks
 Jimi Goodwin (Producer) Forthcoming album
 Young Guns (Engineer) Ones and Zeros Album
 Club Kuru (Producer, Engineer & Mixer) All the Days EP
 Kid Wave (Producer, Engineer & Mixer) Wonderlust album
 Bad Breeding (Producer & Mixer) "Chains" and other tracks
 Pixies (Engineer & Mixer) Indie Cindy Album
 Cherry Ghost (Mixer) Herd Runners Album
 Club Kuru (Producer & Mixer) “All the Days” and “Seesaw” tracks
 Arcane Roots (Producer & Mixer) “Over and Over” track
 Mallory Knox (Engineer & Mixer) Asymmetry Album
 Jimi Goodwin (Producer, Engineer & Mixer) Odludek Album
 Sonny's Burning (Writer, Producer & Mixer) Forthcoming album
 I AM IN LOVE (Mixer) “Proposal” and “Mirrors & Smoke” tracks
 Twin Atlantic (Engineer) Great Divide Album
 AFI (Engineer) Burials Album
 Six. By Seven (Producer & Mixer) Love and Peace and Sympathy Album
 Pixies (Engineer & Mixer)EP1, EP2, & EP3 EPs
 Arcane Roots (Producer) Blood & Chemistry Album
 Pure Love (Engineer & Mixer) Anthems Album
 Surfer Blood (Engineer) Pythons Album
 You Me At Six (Engineer & Mixer) “The Swarm” track
 Maximo Park (Engineer & Mixer) The National Health Album
 Pulled Apart by Horses (Engineer & Mixer) “Sing” & “Molly Drove Me Away” tracks
 Futures (Engineer & Mixer) The Karma Album
 Twin Atlantic (Engineer & Mixer) Free Album
 Airship (Producer & Mixer) Stuck In This Ocean Album
 Young Rebel Set (Producer & Mixer) Curse Our Love Album track
 Bayside (Engineer) Killing Time Album
 The Winchell Riots (Producer & Mixer) Figure 8’s EP
 Doves (Mixer) The Places Between: The Best of Doves Album
 Doves (Co-producer) “Andalucia” and tracks from The Places Between: The Best of Doves Album
 Cherry Ghost (Producer & Mixer) Beneath This Burning Shoreline Album
 Morning Parade (Producer & Mixer) “Marble Attic,” “Youth,” & “Seaside” Tracks
 Evaline (Producer & Mixer) Woven Material Album
 Massive Attack (Programmer) Heligoland Album
 Doves (Co-Producer & Mixer) Kingdom of Rust Album
 Doves (Engineer) Some Cities Album
 The Hours (Engineer) See the Light Album
 People in Planes (Producer) Beyond the Horizon Album
 Starsailor (Engineer) Boy In Waiting EP
 Cherry Ghost (Producer, Engineer, & Mixer) Thirst For Romance Album
 B52s (Engineer) Funplex Album
 ILikeTrains (Producer & Engineer) “Terra Nova” Track
 Massive Attack (Engineer & Programmer) Battle In Seattle OST Album Tracks
 Cooper Temple Clause (Producer) Make This Your Own Album Tracks
 Massive Attack (Producer & Mixer) Collected Album track
 People In Planes (Producer & Mixer) “Instantly Gratified” track and As Far As The Eye Can See Album tracks
 Massive Attack (Programmer) Various Adverts
 Fell City Girl (Producer & Mixer) Swim EP
 Queens of the Stone Age (Producer & Mixer) Over The Years & Through The Woods Live DVD
 Oceansize (Producer & Engineer) Everyone Into Position Album
 KT Tunstall (Engineer) “Under the Weather” track
 Cooper Temple Claus (Producer & Mixer) Kick Up The Fire And Let The Flames Break Loose Album
 Motion Picture Soundtrack (Producer & Mixer) “When All The Lights Go Out” tracks
 Biffy Clyro (Engineer & Programmer) A Blackened Sky Album
 Snuff (Engineer & Programmer) Disposable Income Album
 Cooper Temple Clause (Engineer & Programmer) See This Through and Leave Album
 Reef (Engineer) “Steal Away” Single
 Placebo (Engineer & Programmer) Live in Paris DVD
 My Vitriol (Live Engineer) Live Tracks 
 Mansun (Assistant Engineer) “I Can Only Disappoint You” Track
 Robert Plant  (Assistant Engineer) Dream Land Album
 Elevator Suite (Assistant Engineer) Barefoot & Shitfaced Album
 Medium 21 (Assistant Engineer) Killings from the Dial Album

References 

Year of birth missing (living people)
Living people
21st-century British musicians
British record producers